Piersno may refer to the following places in Poland:
Piersno, Środa Śląska County in Gmina Kostomłoty, Środa Śląska County in Lower Silesian Voivodeship (SW Poland)
Piersno, Trzebnica County in Gmina Trzebnica, Trzebnica County in Lower Silesian Voivodeship (SW Poland)